José Manuel Lara Bosch, 2nd Marquess of Pedroso de Lara (8 March 1946 – 31 January 2015) was a Spanish media executive and businessman. He was the CEO of Grupo Planeta since 2003 and Atresmedia since 2012. Bosch was born in Barcelona, Spain.

Bosch died in Barcelona, Spain from pancreatic cancer, aged 68. He is survived by his wife of 40 years, Consuelo García Píriz and his four children.

References

Other websites

1946 births
2015 deaths
Deaths from pancreatic cancer
Deaths from cancer in Spain
Spanish businesspeople
People from Barcelona
Planeta Group